Simon Daniel Edward Amor (born 25 April 1979) is an English rugby union coach and former player. Amor played in the scrum-half and fly-half positions for London Scottish and captained the England national rugby sevens team. He has been the head coach of London Scottish, England sevens, Hong Kong, and, as recently as 2020, was appointed defence-coach for the England rugby union team.

Early life
Amor was educated at Denmead Preparatory School, Hampton School, St. Mary's University College (Twickenham) and Cambridge University. At Cambridge he earned a blue playing in the 2000 Varsity Rugby Match for Cambridge University RFC against Oxford University RFC at Twickenham Stadium and went on to graduate with a degree in Management Studies. He also completed an MBA whilst playing professional rugby.

Playing career
Amor started his rugby career at London Irish where he played as a junior before joining the senior squad. During the summer of 2002, Amor signed a professional contract with Gloucester. He has previously played for Harlequins, London Irish, Blackheath, Coventry and the Rugby Lions. Whilst at Gloucester he was a replacement in the 2003 Powergen Cup Final in which Gloucester defeated Northampton Saints.

In August 2002, Amor represented the England Sevens at the 2002 Commonwealth Games.He played again at the 2006 Commonwealth Games winning a silver medal.
In 2003 he was part of the England squad to face the Barbarian F.C. at Twickenham.
In December 2004, Amor was the inaugural IRB Sevens Player of the Year. Amor captained England to win the Hong Kong 7s four times.

In August 2005, Amor was instrumental in Gloucester's victory at the Middlesex Sevens.

In May 2006, Amor joined London Wasps, as replacement for their retiring scrum-half, Matt Dawson.
In August 2006, Amor was the key playmaker in London Wasps's victory at the Middlesex Sevens.

Coaching
In 2008, Amor signed as a player/coach for London Scottish. He became a Performance Advisor at UK Sport and was appointed on to the Advisory Board of Ultimate Rugby Sevens. In May 2010, Amor took over the role of Head Coach for London Scottish, and in November 2011, took over the role of Director of Rugby at the club. In 2012 he led them to promotion to the RFU Championship.

He was Head Coach of the England women sevens team at the 2009 Rugby World Cup Sevens. In September 2013 he took over the role of Head Coach of the England national rugby sevens team and was the longest serving England 7s coach. He was responsible for bringing together the men's and women's programs and oversaw them both. In 2016, Amor was appointed Head Coach of the Great Britain Sevens team who went on to win a silver medal at the Olympic Games in Rio, Brazil. 2017 saw England finish 2nd in the World Rugby Sevens Series, equaling their highest ever finish. The previous time this was achieved was in 2006 when Amor was captain of the squad. In 2018 England were runners up at the 2018 Rugby World Cup Sevens. 2019 saw both the men's and the women's sevens teams qualify for 2020 Summer Olympics. In 2020, he was appointed attack coach of the England Rugby team, under Eddie Jones where the team won the 2020 6 Nations Championship and the Autumn Nations Cup. He left the role in May 2021. He is currently the head coach of the Japan national rugby sevens team.

After being appointed the coach of Hong Kong in mid-2021 for a brief spell, Amor went back into coaching sevens rugby, being the technical director of Japan starting in November 2021. Amor remained in the role throughout the teams World Rugby Sevens season. In September 2022, before the beginning of the following season (2022–23), Amor was appointed head coach of the sevens team by the JRFU. It is Amor's third national sevens team he has coached, and the first outside Great Britain.

See also
 Cambridge University RUFC
 Hampton School

References

External links
 
 
 
 
 Gloucester Profile
 
 
 Guinness Premiership profile
 
 

1979 births
Living people
British Olympic coaches
Cambridge University R.U.F.C. players
Coaches of international rugby sevens teams
Commonwealth Games medallists in rugby sevens
Commonwealth Games rugby sevens players of England
Commonwealth Games silver medallists for England
Coventry R.F.C. players
England international rugby sevens players
English rugby union coaches
English rugby union players
Gloucester Rugby players
Harlequin F.C. players
London Irish players
London Scottish F.C. players
Male rugby sevens players
People educated at Hampton School
Rugby sevens players at the 2006 Commonwealth Games
Rugby union fly-halves
Rugby union players from Kingston upon Thames
Wasps RFC players
World Rugby Awards winners
Medallists at the 2006 Commonwealth Games